The hangman's knot or hangman's noose (also known as a collar during the Elizabethan era) is a knot most often associated with its use in hanging a person. For a hanging, the knot of the rope is typically placed under or just behind the left ear, although the most effective position is just ahead of the ear, beneath the angle of the left lower jaw. The pull on the knot at the end of the drop levers the jaw and head violently up and to the right, which combines with the jerk of the rope becoming taut to wrench the upper neck vertebrae apart. This produces very rapid death, whereas the traditional position beneath the ear was intended to result in the mass of the knot crushing closed (occluding) neck arteries, causing cessation of brain circulation. The knot is non-jamming but tends to resist attempts to loosen it.

Number of coils

Surviving nooses in the United Kingdom show simple slipknots that were superseded in the late 19th century with a metal eye spliced into one end of the rope, the noose being formed by passing the other end through it. The classic hangman's knot was largely developed in the United States, the heavy mass of the knot intended to crush blood vessels in the neck and if tightened beneath the jaw, to lever the head to one side. Filmed hangings of war criminals in Europe after World War II, conducted under US jurisdiction, show such knots placed in various locations, including at the back of the neck.

Each additional coil adds friction to the knot, which makes the noose harder to pull closed or open. When Grover Cleveland was the sheriff of Erie County, he performed two hangings. Cleveland was advised by a more experienced Sheriff to grease the rope with tallow and run it through the knot a few times to ensure rapid closure with the drop. The number of coils should therefore be adjusted depending on the intended use, the type and thickness of rope, and environmental conditions such as wet or greasy rope. Six to eight loops are normal when using natural ropes. One coil makes it equivalent to the simple running knot.

Woody Guthrie sings of the hangman using thirteen coils:

Did you ever see a hangman tie a hangknot?
I've seen it many a time and he winds, he winds,
After thirteen times he's got a hangknot.

See also
List of knots

References

Further reading
 The Ashley Book of Knots discusses this knot in the entry for drawing #1119

External links 
 How to tie a Noose Knot using Step-by-Step Animations

Execution equipment
Hanging
Running knots